Brockhurst and Marlston House School is a British independent and boarding preparatory school. It occupies Marlston House, a grade II* listed Elizabethan style house situated in the hamlet of Marlston and the civil parish of Bucklebury in the English county of Berkshire.

The house 
The house lies on a historic site, and the seat of a manor, being occupied by a house from the Elizabethan era. At one point the manor was held by Richard Wightwick, who co-founded Pembroke College of the University of Oxford. By 1855 the house was occupied by Henry Mill Bunbury, who had the house remodelled by Mr. W. Butterfield.

The current Marlston House was built between 1895 and 1899 by Edward Burgess in the Elizabethan style to replace that remodelled house. It was built for George Palmer, who was one of the founders of the Huntley & Palmers biscuit factory, mayor of the nearby town of Reading, and Member of Parliament for Reading. After George Palmer died in 1897, the house was occupied by his son, George William Palmer, who was also mayor of, and Member of Parliament for, Reading.

The house has been used as a school since 1945. It was listed as a grade II* listed building in 1983.

The school 
The school comprises twin parts, known as Brockhurst (boys) and Marlston House (girls). In 2018 they had 311 pupils from the ages three to thirteen. The various facilities provided by the school include 21 acres of games fields, a sports hall, a swimming pool, tennis courts, arts and design studios, Information and communications technology suite and equestrian school. In addition, there is a château in Gascony, south-west France, where the pupils practise French.

Brockhurst was founded in 1884 as a boys’ boarding prep school at Church Stretton in Shropshire. In 1942 it moved to Broughton Hall near Eccleshall in Staffordshire. In 1945 it moved again, to its current home, becoming co-educational in 1995.

In 2009, Country Life magazine included Brockhurst and Marlston House School among the best countryside preparatory schools of Great Britain. In 2018 the School was rated 'Excellent' in all categories by the Independent Schools Inspectorate.

The school's pupils, while the school was at Church Stretton, included politician Julian Critchley. Another former pupil, Arthur Leyland Harrison, played rugby union for England in the 1914 Five Nations Championship and was posthumously awarded the Victoria Cross for his actions on the Zeebrugge Raid of 1918. The politician Michael Heseltine was a pupil at the school when it was at Broughton Hall, Staffordshire.

Notable former pupils 

 Julian Critchley
 Arthur Leyland Harrison
 Michael Heseltine

References

External links
Brockhurst and Marlston House School Official Site

Educational institutions established in 1884
Grade II* listed buildings in Berkshire
Private schools in West Berkshire District
Preparatory schools in Berkshire
1884 establishments in England
Bucklebury